Lázaro Cárdenas del Río (21 May 1895 – 19 October 1970) was a Mexican army officer and politician who served as president of Mexico from 1934 to 1940. 

Born in Jiquilpan, Michoacán, to a working-class family, Cárdenas joined the Mexican Revolution and became a general in the Constitutionalist Army. Although he was not from the state of Sonora, whose revolutionary generals dominated Mexican politics in the 1920s, Cárdenas was hand-picked by Plutarco Elías Calles, Sonoran general and former president of Mexico, as a presidential candidate and won in the 1934 general election.

After founding the National Revolutionary Party (PNR) in the wake of the assassination of president-elect Álvaro Obregón, Plutarco Elías Calles had unofficially remained in power during the Maximato (1928–1934) and expected to maintain that role when Cárdenas took office. Cárdenas, however, out-maneuvered him politically and forced Calles into exile. He established the structure of the National Revolutionary Party, eventually renamed the Party of the Mexican Revolution (PRM), on the sectoral representation of peasant leagues, labor union confederations, and the Mexican Army. Cárdenas's incorporation of the army into the party structure was a deliberate move to diminish the power of the military and prevent their intervention in politics through coups d'état.

A left-wing economic nationalist, Cárdenas led the expropriation of the Mexican oil industry and the creation of the state-owned oil company Pemex in 1938. He implemented large-scale land reform programs in Mexico, redistributing large estates to smallholders in lands termed ejidos. He created the National Polytechnic Institute (IPN) and El Colegio de México (Colmex). His foreign policy supported and gave asylum to Republicans during the Spanish Civil War. An achievement of Cárdenas was his complete surrender of power in December 1940 to his successor, Manuel Ávila Camacho, who was a political moderate without a distinguished military record.

Cárdenas has been praised as "the greatest constructive radical of the Mexican Revolution", for implementing its ideals, but has also been criticized as an "authoritarian populist". He was the first Mexican president to serve for a sexenio, a practice that continues today. According to numerous opinion polls and analysts, Cárdenas is the most popular Mexican president of the 20th century.

Early life and career 
Lázaro Cárdenas del Río was born on 21 May 1895, one of eight children in a lower-middle-class family in the village of Jiquilpan, Michoacán, where his father owned a billiard hall. After the death of his father, from the age of 16, Cárdenas supported his family (including his mother and seven younger siblings). By the time he reached 18, he had worked as a tax collector, a printer's devil, and a jail keeper. Although he left school when he was eleven, he used every opportunity to educate himself and read widely throughout his life, especially works of history.

Military career 

Cárdenas set his sights on becoming a teacher but was drawn into the military during the Mexican Revolution after Victoriano Huerta overthrew President Francisco Madero in February 1913, although Michoacán was far from the revolutionary action that had brought Madero to the Mexican presidency. After Huerta's coup and Madero's assassination, Cárdenas joined a group of Zapatistas, but Huerta's forces scattered the group, where Cárdenas had served as captain and paymaster. Given that revolutionary forces were voluntary organizations, his position of leadership points to his skills and his being a paymaster to the perception that he would be honest in financial matters. Both characteristics followed him through his subsequent career. He escaped the Federal forces in Michoacán and moved north, where he served initially with Álvaro Obregón, then Pancho Villa, and after 1915 when Villa was defeated by Obregón to Plutarco Elías Calles, who served Constitutionalist leader Venustiano Carranza. Although Cárdenas was from the southern state of Michoacán, his key experiences in the Revolution were with Constitutionalist northerners, whose faction won. In particular, he served under Calles, who tasked him with military operations against Yaqui Indians and against Zapatistas in Michoacán and Jalisco, during which time he rose to a field command as general. In 1920, after Carranza was overthrown by northern generals, Cárdenas was given the rank of brigadier general at the age of 25. Cárdenas was appointed provisional governor of his home state of Michoacán under the brief presidency of Adolfo de la Huerta.

Service under President Calles
Cárdenas was a political protégé of Calles, but his ideological mentor was revolutionary General Francisco J. Múgica, a strongly anticlerical, secular socialist. President Calles appointed Cárdenas Chief of Military Operations in the Huasteca, an oil-producing region on the Gulf Coast. Cárdenas saw first-hand the operations of foreign oil companies. In the Huasteca, U.S. oil companies extracted oil, avoided taxes owed to the Mexican government, and treated the region as “conquered territory.” Múgica also was posted to the Huasteca and he and Cárdenas became close. During their time in the Huasteca, Múgica told Cárdenas that “socialism [is] the appropriate doctrine for resolving conflicts in Mexico.”

Governor of Michoacán, 1928–1932 
Cárdenas was appointed governor of his home state of Michoacán in 1928, which was undergoing the political conflict between state and Church, known as the Cristero War. His ideological mentor Múgica had previously served as the state's governor and had attempted to counter the power of the Catholic Church in Mexico through laws. He mobilized groups to support his positions, creating “political shock troops,” consisting of public school teachers and members of a disbanded agrarian league, forming the Confederación Revolucionaria Michoacana del Trabajo, under the slogan of “Union, Land, Work.” The organization was funded by the state government, although not listed as an official expenditure. It became the single-most powerful organization representing both workers and peasants. Mobilizing worker and peasant support and controlling the organization to which they belonged became the model for Cárdenas when he became president.

Land reform
As governor, Cárdenas also prioritized land reform at a time when President Calles was disillusioned by the program. He expropriated haciendas and created ejidos, collectively held, state-controlled landholdings. Ejiditarios, members of the ejido, worked individual plots of land but did not hold title to it as private property. Opposition to the program came from estate owners (hacendados), the clergy, and in some cases, tenant farmers, but Cárdenas continued land reform programs in his state.

During his four years as governor, Cárdenas initiated a modest re-distribution of land at the state level, encouraged the growth of peasant and labor organizations, and improved education at a time when it was neglected by the federal government. Cárdenas ensured teachers were paid on time, personally inspected schools, and opened one hundred new rural schools. Due to his grassroots style of governing, Cárdenas made important policy decisions based on direct information received from the public rather than on the advice of his confidants.

Promotion of tourism, art, and indigenous culture

During his term as governor, Cárdenas sought to bring peace to the state, unite its population divided by the on-going Cristero War, and make Michoacán, especially the historic town of Pátzcuaro into a tourist destination. Once he was president of Mexico, he continued to devote government funding to the project. Cárdenas built a house in Pátzcuaro when he became governor of the state, naming it "La Quinta Eréndira," after the Purépecha princess, who has been identified as Mexico's first anticolonial heroine for her resistance to the Spanish conquest, and a contrasting figure to Malinche, Cortés's cultural translator. Eréndira became a popular historical figure under Cárdenas. At his estate, he commissioned murals for the house, which are now lost, but it is known from historical sources that they had indigenous themes, particularly the rise and fall of the Purépecha Empire at the time of the Spanish conquest. The murals and the texts "appropriate national historical narratives in order to supplant the national myths and locate Mexico's ideal foundations in Michoacán."

Presidential election of 1934 

Calles tapped Cárdenas to be the party's president. Of the revolutionary generals, Cárdenas was considered "honest, able, anti-clerical, and politically astute," He had come from a poor and marginal state of Mexico, but had risen to political prominence by his military skills on the battlefield but importantly he had chosen the correct side of decisive splits since 1913. When he was chosen as the presidential candidate in 1934, no one expected him to be anything other than being loyal to Calles, the "Jefe Máximo", and power behind the presidency since 1929.

As the PNR's candidate, Cárdenas's election was a foregone conclusion. It was politically impossible for his patron, Calles, to serve as president again, but he continued to dominate Mexico after his presidency (1924–28) through "puppet administrations" in a period known as the Maximato. After two of his hand-picked men held office, the PNR balked in 1932 at supporting his first choice, Manuel Pérez Treviño. Instead, they selected Cárdenas as the presidential candidate. Calles agreed, believing he could control Cárdenas as he had controlled his predecessors. Not only had Cárdenas been associated with Calles for two decades, but he had prospered politically with Calles' patronage. As expected, Cárdenas won handily, officially winning over 98 percent of the vote.

Six-Year Plan and presidential campaign 
Cárdenas ran on the Six Year Plan for social and political reform that the party drafted under Calles's direction. Such a multiyear program was patterned after the just-completed Five Year Plan of the Soviet Union. The Six-Year Plan (to span the presidential term 1934–40) was a patchwork of proposals from a variety of participants, but the driving force behind it was Calles, who had given a speech in May 1933, saying that the "Mexican Revolution had failed in most of its important objectives," and that a plan needed to implement its objectives. Interim President Abelardo L. Rodríguez did not get his cabinet's approval for the plan in 1933 so Calles's next move was to present it in draft form to the party convention. "Rather than a blueprint, the Six-Year Plan was a sales prospectus," and a "hopeless jumble" filled with compromises and contradictions, as well as utopian aspirations. But the direction of the plan was toward renewed reform.

The plan called for
destruction of the hacienda economy and creation of a collective system of ejidos (common lands) under government control;
modern secular schools and eradication of the influence of the Catholic Church; and
workers' cooperatives to oppose the excesses of industrial capitalism.

Assured of the backing of the powerful Calles and a presidential victory, Cárdenas took the opportunity to actively campaign in many parts of Mexico rather than remaining in Mexico City. His 25,000-kilometer campaign accomplished several things, including making direct contact with regions and constituents who had never seen a presidential candidate before and thus building Cárdenas a personal power base. The campaign also allowed him to refine and articulate for popular consumption what he considered the important elements of the Six Year Plan. On the campaign trail, he acted more like someone already in office than a candidate, settling disputes between groups. He reached out to Mexican workers, as well as peasants, to whom he promised land reform. Cárdenas promised indigenous peoples schools and educational opportunities, and urged them to join with workers against exploitative practices.

Presidency, 1934–1940

Presidential style 

Cárdenas's first action after taking office late in 1934 was to have his presidential salary cut in half. He became the first occupant of the official presidential residence of Los Pinos. He had the previous residence, the ostentatious Chapultepec Castle, turned into the National Museum of History. In a move that struck at the financial interests of his patron Calles's cronies, Cárdenas closed down their gambling casinos and brothels, where "prominent Callistas had invested their profits from bribery and industrial activities." Cárdenas did not use armored cars or bodyguards to protect himself. In the presidential campaign of 1934, he traveled through much of the rural areas by auto and horseback, accompanied only by Rafael M. Pedrajo, a chauffeur and an aide-de-camp. His fearlessness generated widespread respect for Cárdenas, who had demonstrated his bravery and leadership as a revolutionary general.

Cabinet
Cárdenas's cabinet when he was first in office included Calles family members, his oldest son Rodolfo at the Secretariat of Communications and Public Works (1934–1935); Aarón Sáenz Garza, the brother-in-law of Calles's second son, Plutarco Jr. ("Aco"), was appointed the administrator for Mexico City (1934–1935), a cabinet-level position. Others with loyalty to Calles were radical Tomás Garrido Canabal at the Secretariat of Agriculture and Development (1934–1935); Marxist Narciso Bassols held the post of Secretary of Finance and Public Credit (1934–1935); Emilio Portes Gil, who had been interim president of Mexico following the assassination of Obregón but not chosen as the PNR presidential candidate in 1929, held the position of Foreign Secretary (1934–1935). Cárdenas chose his comrade-in-arms and mentor General Francisco José Múgica as Secretary of the National Economy (1934–1935). As Cárdenas began to chart his course and outflank Calles politically, he replaced Calles loyalists in 1935 with his own men.

Cárdenas and the military

As a revolutionary general, Cárdenas followed in the tradition of his immediate predecessors in the presidency who had standing as military leaders but sought to curb the power of the military. Obregón and Calles sought to downsize and professionalize the Mexican military and make it subordinate to the civilian government. Cárdenas's election had not triggered revolts by disgruntled military men with ambitions to the presidency, as had happened in 1923, 1928, and 1929. Much of the military remained loyal to Calles, but Cárdenas had supporters among the army leadership as well. Cárdenas sought to serve as president in his own right, not be a puppet of Calles, and to do that he needed to broaden his base of support. Cárdenas sought to arm the peasantry as a counterpoise to the army, a move that disturbed the more conservative generals. Cárdenas cultivated the loyalty of the junior officer corps, providing better housing, pensions, and schooling for their children.

Cárdenas and the Catholic Church 
Cárdenas repealed the Calles Law soon after he became president in 1934. Cárdenas earned respect from Pope Pius XI and had a close friendship with Mexican Archbishop Luis María Martínez, a major figure in Mexico's Catholic Church who successfully persuaded Mexicans to obey the government's laws peacefully. However, he also implemented educational reforms, particularly socialist education and the elimination of religious schooling. Nevertheless, the Cárdenas administration bridged a gap between church and state, developed a working and friendly relationship with the church, and helped subdue the bitter animosity between Catholics and leftists that had lingered since the Mexican Revolution, with the Holy See eventually supporting Cárdenas in comparison to condemning the militant atheism of Calles.

Land reform and the peasantry

During Cárdenas' presidency, the government enacted land reform that was "sweeping, rapid, and, in some respects, innovative". He redistributed large commercial haciendas, some 180,000 km2 of land to peasants. With the powers of Article 27 of the Mexican constitution, he created agrarian collectives, or ejidos, which in early twentieth-century Mexico were an atypical form of landholding. Two high-profile regions of expropriation for Cárdenas's agrarian reform were in the productive cotton-growing region in northern Mexico, known as La Laguna, and in Yucatán, where the economy was dominated by henequen production. Other areas that saw significant land reform were Baja California and Sonora in northern Mexico, his home state of Michoacán and Chiapas in southern Mexico.

In 1937, Cárdenas invited Andrés Molina Enríquez, intellectual father of Article 27 of the 1917 Constitution, to accompany him to Yucatán to implement the land reform, even though Molina Enríquez was not a big supporter of the collective ejido system. Although he could not go due to ill health, he defended Cárdenas's action against Luis Cabrera, who argued that the Ejidal Bank that Cárdenas established when he embarked on his sweeping redistribution of land was, in fact, making the Mexican state the new hacienda owner. For Molina Enríquez, the Yucatecan henequen plantations were an "evil legacy" and "hellholes" for the Maya. As a lifelong supporter of land reform, Molina Enríquez's support of Cárdenas's "glorious crusade" was important.

Cárdenas knew that peasant support was important and as a presidential candidate in 1933, he reached out to an autonomous peasant organization, the Liga Nacional Campesina (National Peasant League) and promised to integrate it into the party structure. The Liga split over this question, but one element was integrated into the Partido Nacional Revolucionario. Cárdenas expanded the peasant league's base in 1938 into the Confederación Nacional Campesina (CNC). Cárdenas "believed that an organized peasantry would represent a political force capable of confronting the established landholding elite, as well as providing a critical voting block for the new Mexican state." Scholars differ as to Cárdenas's intent for the CNC, with some viewing it as an autonomous organization that would advocate for peasants regarding land tenure, rural projects, and peasant political interests, while others see the CNC as in patron-client relationship with the state, restricting its autonomy. The CNC was created with the idea of "peasant unification" and was controlled by the government. Peasants' rights were acknowledged, but peasants were to be responsible allies of the political regime. The radical Confederation of Mexican Workers (CTM) and the Mexican Communist Party (PCM) sought to organize peasants, but Cárdenas asserted the government's right to do that since it was in charge of land reform and warned that their attempting to organize the peasantry would sow dissension.

Cárdenas further strengthened the government's role by creating rural militias or reserves, which armed some 60,000 peasants by 1940, which were under the control of the army. The armed peasantry helped promote political stability against regional strongmen (caudillos). They could ensure that government land reform was accomplished. Peasant reserves could protect recipients of reform against estate owners and break rural strikes that threatened government control.

Agrarian reform took place in a patchwork fashion with uneven results. Over years, many regions had experienced peasant mobilization in the face of repression and "low intensity agrarian warfare." The peasant movement in Morelos had mobilized before the Mexican Revolution and had success under Emiliano Zapata's leadership extinguished the hacienda system in that state. In Cárdenas's agrarian reform, with the revolutionary regime consolidated and agrarian problems still unresolved, the president courted mobilized agraristas, who now found the state attentive to their issue. Land reform, with some exceptions such as in Yucatán, took place in areas of previous mobilization. Peasants themselves pushed for agrarian reform and to the extent it was accomplished, they were integral agents not merely the recipients of top-down state largesse. However, the peasantry was under the control of the national government with no outlet for independent organization or the formation of alliances with Mexican urban workers.

Labor 

The other key sector of reform was industrial labor. Article 123 of the 1917 Constitution had empowered workers in an unprecedented way, guaranteeing human rights such as the minimum wage, an eight-hour workday and the right to strike and form trade unions, but in a more comprehensive fashion, Article 123 signaled that the Mexican state was firmly on the side of workers. A labor organization already existed when Cárdenas took office, the CROM union of Luis Morones. Morones was forced out of his cabinet post in Calles's government and the CROM declined in power and influence, with major defections of Mexico City unions, one of which was led by socialist Vicente Lombardo Toledano. Cárdenas promoted Toledano's "purified" Confederation of Mexican Workers, which evolved into the Mexican Confederation of Workers or CTM. The CTM's alliance with Cárdenas was tactical and conditional, seeing their interests being forwarded by Cárdenas, but not controlled by him. As with the agrarian sector with mobilized peasants, mobilized and organized workers had long agitated and fought for their interests. Article 123 of the Constitution was a tangible result of their participation in the Mexican Revolution on the Constitutionalist side. In fact, workers organized by the Casa del Obrero Mundial, a radical labor organization, fought in the Red Battalions against the peasant revolutionaries led by Emiliano Zapata. Lombardo Toledano and the CTM supported Cárdenas's exile of Calles and in the same stroke Cárdenas also exiled CROM's discredited leader, Luis Napoleón Morones.

Cárdenas nationalized the railway system creating the Ferrocarriles Nacionales de México in 1938 and put under a "workers' administration." His most sweeping nationalization was that of the petroleum industry in 1938.

Education 

During the Calles Maximato, Mexican education policies were directed at curtailing the cultural influence of the Catholic Church by introducing sex education and leftist ideology via socialist education, and generally aiming to create a national civic culture. Cárdenas as a presidential candidate, under the patronage of fierce anticlerical Calles, was in favor of such policies. The opposition to socialist education by the Catholic Church as an institution and rural Catholics in such strongholds as Michoacán, Jalisco, and Durango saw the revival of armed peasant opposition, sometimes known as the Second Cristiada. The extent of the opposition was significant and Cárdenas chose to step back from implementing the radical educational policies, particularly as he became engaged with undermining Calles's power. Cárdenas gained support from the Catholic Church when he distanced himself from anticlerical policies.

An important addition to higher education in Mexico was when Cárdenas established the Instituto Politécnico Nacional (IPN), a technical university in Mexico City, in the wake of the 1938 oil expropriation to train engineers and scientists.

Indigenismo 

Cárdenas created the new cabinet-level Department of Indigenous Affairs (Departamento de Asuntos Indígenas) in 1936, with Graciano Sánchez, an agrarista leader in charge. After a controversy at the DAI, Sánchez was replaced by a scholar, Prof. Luis Chávez Orozco. Cárdenas was influenced by an advocate of indigenismo, Moisés Sáenz, who earned a doctorate in education from Columbia University and had held a position in the Calles administration in the Secretariat of Public Education (SEP). Although initially an assimilationist for Mexico's indigenous, he shifted his perspective after a period of residence in a Purépecha village, which he published as Carapan: Bosquejo de una experiencia. He came to see indigenous culture as having value. Sáenz advocated for educational and economic reforms that would better the indigenous, and this became the aim of the department Cárdenas created.

The official 1940 government report on the Cárdenas administration states that “the indigenous problem is one of the most serious that the revolutionary government has had to confront.” The aim of the department was to study fundamental problems concerning Mexico's indigenous, particularly economic and social conditions, and then propose measures to the executive power for coordinated action to promote and manage measures considered to be in the interests of centers of indigenous populations. Most indigenous people were found in Veracruz, Oaxaca, Chiapas, and Yucatán, according to the 1930 national census. In 1936 and 1937, the department had approximately 100 employees and a budget of $750,000 pesos, but as with other aspects of the Cárdenas regime, 1938 marked a significant increase personnel and budget; 350 employees in 1938 and a budget of $2.77 million pesos and in 1939, the high point in the department's budget, there were 850 employees with a budget of $3.75 million pesos. In 1940, the budget remained robust at $3 million pesos, with 650 employees.

The function of the department was primarily economic and educational. Specifically it was tasked with defending indigenous villages and communities, holders of ejidos (ejidatarios) and indigenous citizens from persecution and abuse that could be committed by any type of authority. It defended ejido officials (comisariados ejidales) and agricultural cooperatives. The goals that the department worked toward were primarily economic and education, with cultural actions second. Social measures and public health/sanitation were less important in terms of action for this department.

The department promoted a series of national indigenous congresses, bringing together different indigenous groups to meet as indigenous and discuss common issues. The government's aim in doing this was to have them move in concert toward the “integral liberation” (liberación integral), with their rights respected by the primary goal was to incorporate indigenous into the larger, national population on an equal basis. Initially in 1936 and 1937, there was one annual conference. The first one drew approximately 300 pueblos, while the second only 75. In 1938, there were two conferences with 950 pueblos represented. The last two years of the Cárdenas sexenio there were two congresses each year, but sparser attendance at around 200 pueblos each. The government attempted to engage the active participation of the indigenous pueblos, seeing that such engagement was the key to success, but the fall-off in the last two years indicates decreased mobilization. The department published 12 edited books with a total publication run of 350 as well as 170 tape recorded materials in indigenous languages.

In February 1940, the department established a separate medical/sanitary section with 4 clinics in Chihuahua and one in Sonora, but the largest number were in central in southern Mexico.

In 1940, the first Interamerican Indigenista Congress met in Pátzcuaro, Michoacán, with Cárdenas giving a plenary address to the participants.

Women's suffrage 
Cárdenas had pushed for women's suffrage in Mexico, responding to the pressure from women activists and from the political climate that emphasized equality of citizens. Mexico was not alone in Latin America in not enfranchising women, but in 1932, both Brazil and Uruguay had extended suffrage to women, and Ecuador had also done so. Women had made a significant contribution to the Mexican Revolution, but had not made gains in the postrevolutionary phase. Women who were members of the National Peasants Confederation (Confederación Nacional Campesina) or the Confederation of Mexican Workers (Confederación de Trabajadores Mexicanos) were, by virtue of their membership umbrella organizations, also members of Cárdenas's reorganized party, the Party of the Mexican Revolution or PRM, done in 1938. In practice, however, women were marginalized from power. Women could not stand for national or local governmental elections or vote. The Constitution of 1917 did not explicitly address women's rights and so to enfranchise women required a constitutional amendment. The amendment itself was simple and brief, specifying that "mexicanos" referred to both women and men.

Many PNR congressmen and senators gave supportive speeches for the amendment, but there was opposition. Cárdenas's impending reorganization of the party, which took place in 1938, was a factor in changing some opponents into supporters. In the end, it passed unanimously and was sent to the states to ratify it. Despite the speeches and the ratifications, opponents used a loophole to block the amendment's implementation by refusing to publish notice of the change in the Diario official. Skeptics of women's suffrage were suspicious that conservative Catholic women would take instructions on voting from priests and so undermine the progressive gains of the Revolution. Conservative Catholic women had mobilized during the church-state conflict of the late 1920s, the Cristero Rebellion, giving material aid to Cristero armies, and even forming a secret society, Feminine Brigades of St. Joan of Arc.

The concern about Mexican women taking advise from priests on voting had some foundation in the example of the leftist Spanish Republic of the 1930s. Many Spanish women indeed supported the position of the Catholic Church which was opposed to the republic's anticlerical policies. The Spanish Civil War (1936–1939) was for Mexico a cautionary tale, the failure of a leftist regime after a military coup.

Cárdenas was unable to overcome opposition to women's suffrage although he personally was committed to the cause. Women did not get the vote in Mexico until 1953, when the Mexican government was pursuing economic policies friendlier to business and there was a modus vivendi with the Catholic Church in Mexico.

Partido de la Revolución Mexicana 

The Partido de la Revolución Mexicana (PRM) came into being on March 30, 1938 after the party founded in 1929 by Calles, the Partido Nacional Revolucionario (PNR), was dissolved. Cárdenas's PRM was reorganized again in 1946 as the Institutional Revolutionary Party. Calles founded the PNR in the wake of President-elect Obregón's assassination in order to create some way for revolutionary leaders to maintain order and power. Calles could not be re-elected as president, but did hold power through the newly created party. Often called the "official party", it "was created as a cartel to control localized political machines and interests."

When Cárdenas ran as the candidate of the PNR in 1934, Calles had expected to continue to be the real power in Mexico. Cárdenas might have been one of the short-term, powerless presidents of the years 1929–1934, but instead he built a large and mobilized base of support of industrial workers and peasants and forced Calles into exile in 1935. Cárdenas further consolidated power by dissolving the PNR and creating a new party with a completely different kind of organization.

The PRM was organized in four sectors, industrial labor, peasants, a middle class sector (composed largely of government workers), and the military. This organization was a resurrection of corporatism, essentially organization by estates or interest groups. Each sector of the party had a parallel organization, so that the labor sector was composed of the Confederation of Mexican Workers (CTM), the peasant sector by the National Confederation of Campesinos, (CNC); and the middle class sector by the Federation of Unions of Workers in Service to the State (FSTSE), created in 1938. The old Federal Army had been destroyed in the Revolution and the post-revolutionary military had increasingly been transformed from a collection of veteran revolutionary fighters into a military organized along more traditional lines of hierarchy and control.
The military had in most of Latin America in the post-independence period viewed itself as the arbiter of power and intervened in politics by force or the threat of force. In the post-revolutionary period, presidents of Mexico, including Cárdenas, were former generals in the revolutionary army. Curbing the power of the military was instigated by Álvaro Obregón and Calles, but the threat of revolt and undermining of the state remained, as the Cristero Rebellion showed in the late 1920s, led by a former revolutionary general, Enrique Gorostieta. Cárdenas aimed to undermine the military's potential to dominate politics by making it a sector of the official party. Although some critics questioned the military's incorporation into the party, Cárdenas saw it as a way to assert civilian control. He is quoted as saying, "We did not put the Army in politics. It was already there. In fact it had been dominating the situation, and we did well to reduce its voice to one in four." Cárdenas had already mobilized workers and peasants into a counterweight to the "military's domination of politics."

These groups often had different interests, but rather than creating a pluralist system in which the groups competed, the corporatist model placed the President as the arbiter of interests. Thus, the organization of different interest groups with formal representation in the party gave them access to largesse from the State, but also limited their ability to act autonomously since they were dependents of the new system.

The corporatist model is most often associated with fascism, whose rise in Germany and Italy in the 1930s coincided with Cárdenas's presidency. Cárdenas was emphatically opposed to fascism, but created the PRM and organized the Mexican state on authoritarian lines. That reorganization can be seen as the enduring legacy of the Cárdenas presidency. Although the PRM was reorganized into the Institutional Revolutionary Party in 1946, the basic structure was retained. Cárdenas's calculation that the military's incorporation into the PRM would undermine its power was essentially correct, since it disappeared as a separate sector of the party, but was absorbed into the "popular" sector.

1938 oil expropriation 
 

Cárdenas had had dealings with the oil industry in the Huasteca in his capacity as a military commander. Ongoing issues with the foreign-owned companies and the Mexican petroleum workers' organization became increasingly tense. Early in his presidency, he declared that a previous agreement between companies and the government "was not in harmony with the basic principle of Article 27 of the Constitution." In 1936, the 18,000-member oil workers' union forced oil companies to sign the first-ever collective bargaining agreement. The union demanded 26 million pesos, the companies offered 12 million. Giving more force to Mexican workers' demands, Cárdenas set up the National Oil Administration and the government's Council of Conciliation and Arbitration took jurisdiction over the wage dispute. The Council supported the workers' demands, which the companies refused to pay. To put even more force into the government's position, it cancelled oil concessions dating to the Porfirato. This move was unprecedented in the history of foreign oil in Mexico. Management and high-skilled workers were all foreigners, so the companies thought that nationalization would be a rash move for Mexico. The companies appealed the government's decision to force companies to pay their wages to the Mexican Supreme Court, which ruled against them on 1 March 1938. Cárdenas was ready to act. Cárdenas tasked his old ally, Francisco J. Múgica, with writing the declaration to the nation about expropriation. On 18 March 1938, Cárdenas nationalized Mexico's petroleum reserves and expropriated the equipment of the foreign oil companies in Mexico. The announcement inspired a spontaneous six-hour parade in Mexico City; it was followed by a national fundraising campaign to compensate the private companies.

The legislation for nationalization provided compensation for the expropriated assets, but Cárdenas' action angered the international business community and Western governments, especially the United Kingdom. The Mexican government was more worried about the lack of technical expertise within the nation to run the refineries. Before leaving, the oil companies had ensured they left nothing of value behind, hoping to force Cárdenas to accept their conditions.

Mexico was eventually able to restart the oil fields and refineries, but production did not rise to pre-nationalization levels until 1942, after the entry of the United States into World War II. The US sent technical advisers to Mexico to ensure production could support the overall Allied war effort.

In 1938, the British severed diplomatic relations with Cárdenas' government, and boycotted Mexican oil and other goods. An international court  ruled that Mexico had the authority for nationalization. With the outbreak of World War II, oil became a highly sought-after commodity. The company that Cárdenas founded, Petróleos Mexicanos (or Pemex), later served as a model for other nations seeking greater control over their oil and natural gas resources. In the early 21st century, its revenues continued to be the most important source of income for the country, despite weakening finances. Cárdenas founded the National Polytechnic Institute to ensure the education and training of people to run the oil industry.

Spanish Civil War and refugees in Mexico 

Cárdenas supported the Republican government of Spain against right-wing general Francisco Franco's forces during the Spanish Civil War. Franco was given support by Germany and Italy. Mexico's support of the Republican government was "by selling arms to the Republican army, underwriting arms purchases from third parties, supporting the Republic in the League of Nations, providing food, shelter and education for children orphaned during the Spanish Civil War." 
Although Mexico's efforts in the Spanish Civil War were not enough to save the Spanish Republic, it did provide a place of exile for as many as 20,000-40,000 Spanish refugees. Among those who reached Mexico were distinguished intellectuals who left a lasting imprint on Mexican cultural life. The range of refugees may be seen from an analysis of the 4,559 passengers arriving in Mexico in 1939 on board the ships Sinaia, Ipanema and Mexique; the largest groups were technicians and qualified workers (32%), farmers and ranchers (20%), along with professionals, technicians, workers, business people students and merchants, who represented 43% of the total. The Casa de España, founded with Mexican government support in the early 1930s, was an organization to provide a haven for Spanish loyalist intellectuals and artists. It became the Colegio de México in October 1940, an elite institution of higher education in Mexico, with the support of Cárdenas's government.

In 1936, Cárdenas allowed Russian exile Leon Trotsky to settle in Mexico, reportedly to counter accusations that Cárdenas was a Stalinist. Cárdenas was not as left-wing as Leon Trotsky and other socialists would wish, but Trotsky described his government as the only honest one in the world.

Relations with Latin America 
Mexico's most important relations with foreign countries during the Cárdenas presidency was the United States, but Cárdenas attempted to influence fellow Latin American nations viable formal diplomatic efforts in Cuba, Chile, Colombia, and Peru, especially in the cultural sphere. Mexico sent artists, engineers, and athletes as goodwill efforts. No Latin American country emulated Cárdenas's radical policies in the agrarian sector, education, or economic nationalism.

Other presidential actions 
The development bank Nacional Financiera was founded during his term as president. Although not extensively active during that period, in the post-World War II era of the Mexican Miracle, the bank was an important tool in government industrialization projects.

Cárdenas became known for his progressive program of building roads and schools and promoting education, gaining Congressional approval to allocate twice as much federal money to rural education as all his predecessors combined.

Cárdenas ended capital punishment (in Mexico, usually in the form of a firing squad). Capital punishment has been banned in Mexico since that time. The control of the republic by Cárdenas and the PRI (Partido Revolucionario Institucional) predecessor Partido de la Revolución Mexicana without widespread bloodshed effectively signaled the end of rebellions that began with the 1910 Mexican Revolution. Despite Cárdenas' policy of socialist education, he also improved relations with the Roman Catholic Church during his administration.

Failed Saturnino Cedillo revolt, 1938–1939 

The last military major revolt in Mexico was that of Saturnino Cedillo, a regional caudillo and former revolutionary general whose power base was in the state of San Luis Potosí. Cedillo was a supporter of Calles and had participated in the formation of the Partido Nacional Revolucionario. He was a "paradigmatic figure," acting as a strongman in his region and mediating between the federal government and his local power base. As a powerbroker with demonstrated military and political skills, he had a great deal of autonomy in San Luis Potosí, serving a term as governor (1927–32), but then modeling Calles's Maximato was the power behind the governorship. Cedillo supported Cárdenas in his power struggle with Calles. However, relations between Cedillo and Cárdenas soured, particularly as Cárdenas's new political system was consolidated and undermined the autonomous power of local caciques.

Cárdenas was ideologically more radical than Cedillo, and Cedillo became a major figure in right-wing opposition to Cárdenas. Groups around him included the fascist “Gold Shirts”, seen as a force capable of ousting Cárdenas. Cedillo rose in revolt in 1938 against Cárdenas, but the federal government had clear military superiority and crushed the uprising. In 1939, Cedillo, members of his family, and a number of supporters were killed, Cedillo himself was betrayed by a follower while he was in hiding. He was “the last of the great military caciques of the Mexican Revolution who maintained his own quasi-private army,” and who constructed “his campesino fiefdom.” Cárdenas's victory over Cedillo showed the power and consolidation of the newly reorganized Mexican state, but also a showdown between two former revolutionary generals in the political sphere.

Other political opposition to Cárdenas 
There was more organized and ideological opposition to Cárdenas. Right-wing political groups opposed Cárdenas's policies, including the National Synarchist Union (UNS), a popular, pro-Catholic, quasi-fascist movement founded in 1937 that opposed his "atheism" and collectivism. Catholic, pro-business conservatives founded the National Action Party (PAN) in 1939, which became the principal opposition party in later years and won the presidency in 2000.

Presidential election of 1940 

In the elections of 1940, Cárdenas, hoping to prevent another uprising or even "an outright counter-revolution throughout the Republic" by those opposed to his leftist policies, endorsed the PRM nominee Manuel Ávila Camacho, a moderate conservative. Obregonista Francisco Múgica would have been Cárdenas's ideological heir, and he had played an important role in the Revolution, the leader of the left-wing faction that successfully placed key language in the Constitution of 1917, guaranteeing the rights of labor. Múgica had known Cárdenas personally since 1926 when the two were working in Veracruz. Múgica had served in Cárdenas's cabinet as Secretary of the National Economy and as Secretary of the Ministry of Communications and Public Works. In those positions, Múgica made sure the federal government pursued social goals; Múgica was considered "the social conscience of Cardenismo." Múgica resigned his cabinet post to be a candidate for the 1940 presidential election.

However, the political system was not one of open competition among candidates, although the PRM's rules required an open convention to select the candidate. Cárdenas established the unwritten rule that the president chose his successor. Cárdenas chose political unknown Manuel Ávila Camacho, far more centrist than Múgica, as the PRM's official candidate. He was "known as a conciliator rather than a leader" and later derided as "the unknown soldier." Múgica withdrew, realizing his personal ambitions would not be satisfied, and went on to hold other posts in the government. Cárdenas may well have hoped Ávila Camacho would salvage some of his progressive policies and be a compromise candidate compared to his conservative opponent, General Juan Andreu Almazán. Cárdenas is said to have secured the support of the CTM and the CNC for Ávila Camacho by personally guaranteeing their interests would be respected.

The campaign and elections were marked by violent incidents; on election-day the opposing parties hijacked numerous polling places and each issued their own "election results". Cárdenas himself was unable to vote on election day because the polling place closed early to prevent supporters of Almazán from voting. Since the government controlled the electoral process, the official results declared Ávila Camacho as winner; Almazán cried fraud and threatened revolt, trying to set up a parallel government and congress. Ávila Camacho crushed Almazán's forces and assumed office in December 1940. His inauguration was attended by US Vice President-elect Henry A. Wallace, who was appointed by the U.S. as a "special representative with the rank of Ambassador Extraordinary and Plenipotentiary" for Mexico, indicating that the U.S. recognized the legitimacy of the election results. Almazán also attended Ávila Camacho's inauguration.

Much to the surprise of Mexicans who expected that Cárdenas might follow the example of Calles and remain the power behind the presidency—particularly since Ávila Camacho did not appear to have major leadership skills at a time that the conflict in Europe and domestic turmoil were in evidence—he set the important precedent of leaving the presidency and its powers to his successor.

Post-presidency 

After his presidential term that ended 1 December 1940, Cárdenas served as Mexico's Minister of War 1942–1945, when Mexico was a solid participant in World War II, which reassured Mexican nationalists concerned about a close alliance with the United States.

It has been said that Cárdenas was the only president associated with the Institutional Revolutionary Party (PRI) who did not use the office to make himself wealthy. He retired to a modest home by Lake Pátzcuaro, Michoacán, and worked the rest of his life supervising irrigation projects and promoting free medical clinics and education for the nation's poor. He also continued to speak out about international political issues and in favor of greater democracy and human rights in Latin America and elsewhere. For example, he was one of the participants in the Russell Tribunal for investigating war crimes in Vietnam. Although Cárdenas did not play the role that Calles had as the power behind the presidency, Cárdenas did exert influence on the PRI and in Mexican politics. He opposed the candidacy of Miguel Alemán Valdés for president in 1952, opposed the Vietnam War, and opposed the U.S. policy toward Cuba after the 1959 Cuban Revolution.

Cárdenas was not happy with the rightward shift of Mexican presidents, starting with the presidency of Miguel Alemán (1946-1952). During the presidency of Adolfo López Mateos (1958-1964), Cárdenas emerged from retirement and pressed the president toward leftist stances. With the triumph of the Cuban Revolution in January 1959, Cárdenas among others in Latin America saw the hope of young revolution. Mexico was run by a party that claimed the legacy of the Mexican Revolution but had turned away from revolutionary ideals. Cárdenas went to Cuba in July 1959 and was with Castro at a huge rally where the former guerrilla leader declared himself premier of Cuba. Cárdenas returned to Mexico with the hope that the ideals of the Mexican Revolution could be revived, with land reform, support for agriculture, and an expansion of education and health services to Mexicans. He also directly appealed to López Mateos to free jailed union leaders. López Mateos became increasingly hostile to Cárdenas, who was explicitly and implicitly rebuking him. To Cárdenas he said, "They say the Communists are weaving a dangerous web around you." The pressure on López Mateos had an impact, and he began implementing reforms in land, education, and the creation of social programs that emulated those under Cárdenas. Cárdenas withdrew his public challenge to the PRI's policies and supported López Mateos's designated successor in 1964, Gustavo Díaz Ordaz, his Minister of the Interior. 
In 1968, Cárdenas did not anticipate the draconian crackdown by Díaz Ordaz in the run-up to the Mexico City Summer Olympics. That summer saw the emergence of the Mexican Movement of 1968, which mobilized tens of thousands of students and middle class supporters during the summer and early fall 1968. The movement ended in the bloody Tlatelolco Massacre on 2 October 1968. During the troubles that summer, one of Cárdenas's long-time friends, Heberto Castillo Martínez, a professor of mechanical engineering at the National University, actively participated in the movement and was pursued by Díaz Ordaz's secret police. Cárdenas hosted a meeting at his residence in the Polanco section of Mexico City with Castillo and some student leaders. Cárdenas was increasingly concerned about the impact on the movement on the political peace that had been built by the party. Despite the National University being a center of the movement, Cárdenas did not think that the government would violate the university's autonomy and take over the campus. It did, with tanks rolling into campus on 18 September. Castillo had a harrowing escape. In October government troops fired on demonstrators at the Plaza of the Three Cultures in Tlatelolco, someone who had been there made his way to Cárdenas's house to tell him in tears what happened. Cárdenas's wife Amalia reportedly said, "And I believe that the General shed some tears too."

Cárdenas died of lung cancer in Mexico City on 19 October 1970 at the age of 75. He is buried in the Monument to the Revolution in Mexico City, sharing his final resting place with Venustiano Carranza, Pancho Villa, and Plutarco Elias Calles. Cárdenas's son Cuauhtémoc Cárdenas and his grandson Lázaro Cárdenas Batel have been prominent Mexican politicians.

Honors
In his honor, his name was given to a number of cities, towns, and a municipality in Mexico, including Lázaro Cárdenas, Michoacán, the municipality of Lázaro Cárdenas, Quintana Roo, Lázaro Cárdenas, Jalisco, and other smaller communities. A major dam project on the Nazas River named for him was inaugurated in 1946. There are also many streets that have been named after him, including the Eje Central Lázaro Cárdenas in Mexico City and highways in Guadalajara, Monterrey and Mexicali. Šetalište Lazaro Kardenasa (Lázaro Cárdenas promenade) in Belgrade, Serbia, is also named after him, as is a street in Barcelona, Spain, and a monument in a park in Madrid dedicated to his memory for his role in admitting defeated Spanish Republicans to Mexico after the Civil War in that country.

In 1955, Lázaro Cárdenas was one of several recipients that year of the Stalin Peace Prize, awarded to foreigners politically sympathetic to the Soviet Union. The prize was later renamed for Lenin as part of de-Stalinization.

A station in the Mexico City Metro was named after him.

Legacy 

President Cárdenas and his administration are given credit by socialists for expanding the distribution of land to the peasants, establishing new welfare programs for the poor, and nationalizing the railroad and petroleum industries, including the oil company that Cárdenas founded, Petróleos Mexicanos. Toward the end of his presidency, unhappy landowners and foreign capitalists began to challenge his programs and his power. His choice of his close associate Manuel Ávila Camacho rather than a candidate with a distinguished record as a revolutionary leader was displeasing to many, and occasioned a possible military revolt.

The party that Cárdenas founded, the Partido de la Revolución Mexicana (PRM), established the basic structure of sectoral representation of important groups, a structure retained by its successor in 1946, the PRI. The PRI continued in power until 2000. This is attributed by some to electoral fraud and coercion. This legacy led his son, Cuauhtémoc Cárdenas, to form the Democratic Revolution Party (PRD) to contest the 1988 presidential election. Since that year, the PRD has become one of the three major parties in Mexico, gaining working class support that was previously enjoyed by the PRI.

In his "Political Testament", written the year before his death and published posthumously, he acknowledged that his regime had failed to make the changes in distribution of political power and corruption that were the basis for his presidency and the revolution. He expressed his dismay in the fact that some people and groups were making themselves rich to the detriment of the mainly poor majority. It was said of Cárdenas in a eulogy that "he was the greatest figure produced by the revolution... an authentic revolutionary who aspired to the greatness of his country, not personal aggrandizement."

Philippine President Ramon Magsaysay patterned his people–oriented government on the principles which he found in a biography of Cárdenas written by William Cameron Townsend.

See also 

History of Mexico
List of heads of state of Mexico
Monument to Lázaro Cárdenas
Lázaro Cárdenas Park, Puerto Vallarta, Mexico
Statue of Lázaro Cárdenas (Madrid)

References

Further reading

In English 

Ashby, Joe C. Organized Labor and the Mexican Revolution under Lázaro Cárdenas. Chapel Hill: University of North Carolina Press 1963.
Bantjes, Adrian A. "Cardenismo: Interpretations" in Encyclopedia of Mexico, vol. 1. pp. 195–199. Chicago: Fitzroy and Dearborn 1997.
Becker, Marjorie (1995). Setting the Virgin on Fire: Lázaro Cárdenas, Michoacán Peasants, and the Redemption of the Mexican Revolution. Berkeley: University of California Press. .
Cárdenas, Enrique. "The Great Depression and Industrialization: The Case of Mexico" in Rosemary Thorp, ed. Latin America in the 1930s: The Role of the Periphery in World Crisis. London 1984, pp. 222–41.
Cline, Howard F. The United States and Mexico, second edition, Chapter 11, "The Cárdenas Upheaval", pp. 215–238. Cambridge: Harvard University Press 1961.
Dulles, John W. F. Yesterday in Mexico: A Chronicle of the Revolution 1919–1936. Austin: University of Texas Press 1961.
Dwyer, John. "Diplomatic Weapons of the Weak: Mexican Policymaking during the U.S.-Mexican Agrarian Dispute, 1934–1941,Diplomatic History, 26:3 (2002): 375
Hamilton, Nora. The Limits of State Authority: Post-Revolutionary Mexico. Princeton: Princeton University Press 1982.
Hamilton, Nora. "Lázaro Cárdenas" in Encyclopedia of Mexico, vol. 1, pp. 192–195. Chicago: Fitzroy and Dearborn 1997.
Jolly, Jennifer. Creating Pátzcuaro, Creating Mexico: Art, Tourism, and Nation Building Under Lázaro Cárdenas. Austin: University of Texas Press 2018. 
Knight, Alan. "Cardenismo: Juggernaut or Jalopy?" Journal of Latin American Studies 26 (1994).
Knight, Alan. "The Rise and Fall of Cardenismo" in Mexico Since Independence, Leslie Bethell, ed. New York: Cambridge University Press 1991, pp. 241–320, 417-422.
Krauze, Enrique, Mexico: Biography of Power. New York: HarperCollins 1997. 
Leonard, Thomas M.; Rankin, Monica; Smith, Joseph; Bratzel, John (ed.) (September 2006). Latin America during World War II. Lanham, Maryland: Rowman & Littlefield. .
Lucas, Jeffrey Kent (2010). The Rightward Drift of Mexico's Former Revolutionaries: The Case of Antonio Díaz Soto y Gama. Lewiston, New York: Edwin Mellen Press. .
Michaels, Albert L. "The Crisis of Cardenismo," Journal of Latin American Studies vol. 2 (May 1970): 51-79.
Powell, T.G. Mexico and the Spanish Civil War. Albuquerque: University of New Mexico Press 1981.
Riding, Alan (1986). Distant Neighbors. New York City: Vintage Books. .
Smith, Peter H. (April 1996). Talons of the Eagle: Dynamics of U.S.-Latin American Relations (2nd edition). USA: Oxford University Press. .
 Townsend, William Cameron. Lázaro Cárdenas, Mexican Democrat. Ann Arbor 1952.
 Weston, Jr., Charles H.; "The Political Legacy of Lázaro Cárdenas", The Americas, Vol. 39, No. 3 (Jan., 1983), pp. 383–405 Published by: Academy of American Franciscan History Stable, URL: https://www.jstor.org/stable/981231 Accessed: February 26, 2009 14:16
 Whetten, Nathan L. Rural Mexico. Chicago 1948.
 Weston, Charles H. "The Political Legacy of Lázaro Cárdenas." The Americas, Vol. 39, No. 3 (Jan., 1983), pp. 383–405 Stable URL: https://www.jstor.org/stable/981231
 Weyl, Nathaniel and Sylvia Weyl. The Reconquest of Mexico: The Years of Lázaro Cárdenas. London 1939.

In Spanish 

Anguiano, Arturo. El Estado y la política obrera del cardenismo. Mexico City: Era 1975.
Benítez, Fernando. Lázaro Cárdenas y la revolución mexicana, vol. 3 Historia de la revolución mexicana. Colegio de México 1978.
Córdova, Arnaldo. La política de masas del cardenismo. Mexico City: Era 1974.
Gilly, Adolfo. El cardenismo, una utopía mexicana. Mexico City: Cal y Arena 1994.
González, Luis. Los Artífices del Cardenismo: Historia de la Revolución Mexicana. vol. 14. Mexico City: El Colegio de México 1979.
Hernández Chávez, Alicia. La mecánica cardenista: Histora de la Revolución Mexicana. vol. 16. Mexico City: Colegio de México 1979.
Krauze, Enrique. Lázaro Cárdenas: General misionero. Mexico City: Fondo de Cultura Económico 1987.
Lanni, Octavio. El estado capitalista en la época de Cárdenas. Mexico 1977.
León, Samuel and Ignacio Marván. En el cardenismo (1934–1940). Mexico 1985.
Medin, Tzvi. Ideología y praxis política de Lázaro Cárdenas. Mexico City: Siglo XXI 1972, 13th edition 1986.
Suárez Valles, Manuel. Lázaro Cárdenas: una vida fecunda al servicio de México (Mexico City, 1971).
Viscaíno, Rogelio. Cárdenas y la izquierda mexicana. Mexico 1975.

External links

 

Presidents of Mexico
Presidents of the Institutional Revolutionary Party

Mexican revolutionaries
Governors of Michoacán
World War II political leaders
Institutional Revolutionary Party politicians
Mexican generals
Mexican atheists
People from Jiquilpan, Michoacán
People of the Mexican Revolution
Politicians from Michoacán
Stalin Peace Prize recipients
1895 births
1970 deaths
Mexican Secretaries of the Interior
Deaths from cancer in Mexico
Mexican social democrats